Federal Route 62, or Jalan Bandar Pusat Jengka Timur, is the main federal road in Bandar Pusat Jengka, Pahang, Malaysia. There are many Federal Land Development Authority (FELDA) settlements along this road.

Features

At most sections, the Federal Route 62 was built under the JKR R5 road standard, allowing maximum speed limit of up to 90 km/h.

List of junctions and towns

References

062
Roads in Pahang